Aciuroides is a genus of ulidiid or picture-winged fly in the family Ulidiidae.

Species
A. fasciata Hering, 1941
A. insecta Hendel, 1914
A. plaumanni Hering, 1941

References

Ulidiidae
Tephritoidea genera
Diptera of South America